Richard Humpton (1733 – 1804) was born in Yorkshire, England of parents Richard Humpton and Dorothy Grindall. He purchased a captain's commission in the Royal Army and fought in the Raid on St Malo during the Seven Years' War. While posted in the West Indies, he resigned his commission and moved to the Susquehanna River in Pennsylvania. At the beginning of the American Revolutionary War he offered his services to the patriot cause and was named a lieutenant colonel in 1776. Later that year he became colonel commanding the 11th Pennsylvania Regiment. Tasked with collecting boats on the Delaware River, his attention to this assignment materially helped the Americans win the Battle of Trenton in December 1776.

He commanded the 2nd Pennsylvania Brigade at Brandywine and Paoli in September 1777. After bringing charges against Anthony Wayne for Paoli, he led the 2nd Brigade at Germantown in October. He was present at Monmouth and assumed command of the 10th Pennsylvania Regiment shortly afterward. In January 1781 he took command of the 6th Pennsylvania Regiment and two years later he transferred to lead the 2nd Pennsylvania Regiment. He received a brevet promotion to brigadier general in September 1783 and retired to his farm. He later served as adjutant general of the state militia and was a member of the Society of the Cincinnati. He married Elizabeth Morris but the couple had no children. He is buried in the cemetery of the Friends Meeting at Caln Township, Chester County, Pennsylvania.

References

External links 

 fold3.com Richard Humpton's signature on an historic document

1733 births
1804 deaths
Continental Army officers from Pennsylvania
People of colonial Pennsylvania
Pennsylvania in the American Revolution